1st Armoured Regiment may refer to:

1st Armoured Regiment (Australia)
1st Armoured Regiment (New Zealand) (c. 1944–1950s), New Zealand Army
1st Armoured Regiment (Poland) (1939—1946)